Eyüboğlu is a Turkish name, meaning "son of Eyüp". It may refer to:

People with the surname Eyüboğlu 
Bedri Rahmi Eyüboğlu (1911–1975), Turkish painter and mosaic muralist 
Eren Eyüboğlu (1913–1988), Romanian-born Turkish painter and mosaic muralist 
Orhan Eyüboğlu (1918–1980), Turkish politician 
Mualla Eyüboğlu (1919–2009), Turkish architect
Sabahattin Eyüboğlu (1908–1973), Turkish writer

Other uses 
Eyüboğlu High School, founded in 1970 by Dr. Rüstem Eyüboğlu.

Turkish-language surnames
Patronymic surnames
Surnames from given names